Jakub Šípek (born 21 February 1999) is a professional Czech football second striker currently playing for Hradec Králové in the Czech First League.

He made his senior league debut for Hradec Králové on 19 February 2017 in a Czech First League 0–2 home loss to Dukla Prague. He scored his first goal in his second league appearance five days later – a 1–3 away loss at Jihlava.

External links 
 
 Jakub Šípek official international statistics
 
 Jakub Šípek profile on the FC Hradec Králové official website

Czech footballers
1999 births
Living people
Czech First League players
FC Hradec Králové players
MFK Chrudim players
Czech National Football League players
Association football forwards
Czech Republic youth international footballers